The 2006–07 Iowa Hawkeyes men's basketball team represented the University of Iowa as members of the Big Ten Conference during the 2006–07 NCAA Division I men's basketball season. The team was led by eighth-year head coach Steve Alford and played their home games at Carver–Hawkeye Arena. The Hawkeyes finished the season 17–14 overall and 9–7 in Big Ten play (tied for fourth place). This marked the first time since the 1976–1977 season that an Iowa men's basketball team with a winning record failed to make either the NCAA tournament or the NIT.

Roster

Schedule/Results

|-
!colspan=8 style=| Non-Conference Regular Season
|-

|-
!colspan=8 style=| Big Ten Regular Season
|-

|-
!colspan=8 style=| Big Ten tournament

Rankings

References

Iowa Hawkeyes men's basketball seasons
Iowa
2006 in sports in Iowa
2007 in sports in Iowa